Myanmar competed at the 2012 Summer Olympics in London, held from 27 July to 12 August 2012. This was the nation's sixteenth appearance at the Olympics, although at most previous Games it competed under the name Burma. Myanmar did not participate at the 1976 Summer Olympics in Montreal for political reasons.

Myanmar Olympic Committee sent a total of six athletes to the Games, an equal number of men and women, to compete in 5 sports, tying the record with Beijing for the most athletes representing Myanmar at a single Olympics. Among these athletes, archer Nay Myo Aung and single sculls rower Shwe Zin Latt competed at their second consecutive Olympics. Pistol shooter Maung Kyu, who competed at his first Olympics, was the oldest member of the team, at 41. Meanwhile, track runner Zaw Win Thet, the youngest of the team, at age 21, was appointed by the committee as the national flag bearer at the opening ceremony. Myanmar marked its return to Olympic judo competition following a twenty-year absence.

Myanmar has yet to win an Olympic medal.

Archery

Myanmar sent archers to the Olympics for the fourth time, seeking the nation's first Olympic medal in the sport. The nation was given one spot in the men's individual competition through Tripartite Commission invitation.

Athletics

Men

Women

Judo

Myanmar has had 1 judoka invited.

Rowing

Myanmar has received a wild card.

Women

Qualification Legend: FA=Final A (medal); FB=Final B (non-medal); FC=Final C (non-medal); FD=Final D (non-medal); FE=Final E (non-medal); FF=Final F (non-medal); SA/B=Semifinals A/B; SC/D=Semifinals C/D; SE/F=Semifinals E/F; QF =Quarterfinals; 'R =Repechage

Shooting

Myanmar has received a wild card.

Men

See also
 Myanmar at the 2012 Summer Paralympics

References

External links
 London 2012 Official Website 

Nations at the 2012 Summer Olympics
2012
2012 in Burmese sport